Triphosa haesitata, the tissue moth, is a species of geometrid moth in the family Geometridae. It is found in North America.

The MONA or Hodges number for Triphosa haesitata is 7285.

Subspecies
These two subspecies belong to the species Triphosa haesitata:
 Triphosa haesitata affirmaria (Walker, 1861)
 Triphosa haesitata haesitata (Guenée in Boisduval & Guenée, 1858)

References

Further reading

External links

 

Hydriomenini
Articles created by Qbugbot
Moths described in 1858